is a railway station where the Nishitetsu Kaizuka Line and the JR Kagoshima Main Line meet in Higashi-ku, Fukuoka, Japan.

Adjacent Stations

Lines 
 Kyushu Railway Company (JR Kyushu)
 Kagoshima Main Line
 Nishi-Nippon Railroad (Nishitetsu)
 Kaizuka Line

Station layout

JR Chihaya Station 
The station is above ground level with 2 platforms and 4 tracks.

Tracks

Nishitetsu Chihaya Station 
The station is above ground level with an island platform and two tracks.

Tracks

History 
There had been a Nishitetsu station named  since 1951. In the course of the redevelopment of a former railway yard in the area, the station was relocated and upgraded to a joint station for Nishitetsu and JR. The JR station was opened in 2003 and the Nishitetsu station was renamed and rebuilt in 2004. The original location of Nakano Station is a few blocks away from the present station.

 June 15, 1951 - Nishitetsu opens Nakano Station.
 July 7, 2003 - JR Kyushu opens Chihaya station.
 August 2, 2004 - Nishitetsu relocates Nakano Station and renames it Nishitetsu Chihaya Station. (Originally scheduled for August 1, but postponed because of an approaching typhoon.)

Passenger statistics
In fiscal 2016, the station was used by 11,923 passengers daily, and it ranked 11th among the busiest stations of JR Kyushu.

References 

Railway stations in Japan opened in 1951
Railway stations in Fukuoka Prefecture